Didymella is a genus of fungi belonging to the family Didymellaceae.

The genus has cosmopolitan distribution.

Species

Species include:

Didymella abieticola 
Didymella acaciae 
Didymella acanthophila 
Didymella proximella

References

Pleosporales
Dothideomycetes genera